The Incredible Toon Machine is a game from Sierra On-Line, and is the sequel to Sid & Al's Incredible Toons, also from Sierra. The game is a Windows port of Sid & Al's Incredible Toons with added multimedia features such as animated cut scenes between levels and CD music tracks.

Gameplay
The objective, like its sister series and its prequel, is to finish a series of Rube Goldberg contraptions with crucial parts left out. The Incredible Toon Machine features many critters, all of which also appear in its prequel, including Al E. Cat, Sid E. Mouse, Eunice Elephant, and others. Al will chase and eat Sid whenever he has the chance. Also, Sid wears heart-patterned boxers under his yellow skin.

Parts list
A lot of the parts used in The Incredible Toon Machine are different from the ones used in other The Incredible Machine games. Most items can be flipped horizontally, a few items can be flipped vertically and the hatpin can be rotated in any of the four directions.

Music
Some of the musical pieces that play in the game are Oh Where, Oh Where Has my Little Dog Gone, The Irish Washerwoman, the Toccata and Fugue in D Minor by Johann Sebastian Bach on Organ, On the Beautiful Blue Danube by Johann Strauss II, the Infernal Galop by Jacques Offenbach, The Barber of Seville Overture by Gioachino Rossini, The Romeo and Juliet Fantasy Overture by Pyotr Ilyich Tchaikovsky, and the Symphony No. 25 by Wolfgang Amadeus Mozart, and the Ranz des vaches and Finale from the William Tell Overture by Gioachino Rossini.

Development history
Although the basic concepts are similar between the original series and the cartoon-style series, they differ in the design of the parts. Some parts exist only in the cartoon-style series, some only in the original series.

Reception

External links
 

1994 video games
Classic Mac OS games
Windows games
Puzzle video games
Sierra Entertainment games
Video games developed in the United States

nl:The Incredible Machine#Sid & Al